Rantabe is a rural municipality in Madagascar. It belongs to the district of Maroantsetra, which is a part of Analanjirofo Region. The population of the commune was estimated to be approximately 20,000 in 2001 commune census.

Rantabe has a riverine harbour. Primary and junior level secondary education are available in town. The majority 82% of the population of the commune are farmers.  The most important crops are rice and vanilla, while other important agricultural products are coffee and cloves.  Services provide employment for 12% of the population. Additionally fishing employs 6% of the population.

Roads
The town is situated at the N5, south of the mouth of the Rantabe river into the Indian Ocean.

Nature
the Makira Natural Park

References

Populated places in Analanjirofo